The Silver Pears Trophy was an award presented annually by Pears Cyclopaedia for "outstanding British achievement in any field." The trophy was possibly awarded prior to 1953 and after 1958, but more research is needed on the subject.

Award recipients 

 1953: Colonel Sir John Hunt
 1954: Sir Roger Bannister (20 September 1954).
 1955: Bertrand Russell
 1957: Laurence Olivier
 1958: Professor Sydney Chapman

See also 
 Commonwealth Games
 Trophy

Notes

References 

British awards